Vladimir Lepko (1898–1963) was a Soviet and Russian actor. People's Artist of the RSFSR (1954).

He died 19 October 1963 and is buried at Novodevichy Cemetery.

Selected filmography
 The Overcoat (1926) (uncredited)
 Lieutenant Kijé (1934) (uncredited)
 Lyotchiki (1935)
 The Lonely White Sail (1937)
 Wish upon a Pike (1938)
 The Train Goes East (1947)
 They Have a Motherland (1949)
 Cossacks of the Kuban (1950)
 The Miners of Donetsk (1950) (uncredited)
 True Friends (1954) (uncredited)
 Did We Meet Somewhere Before (1954)
 The Rumyantsev Case (1955)
 Ivan Brovkin on the State Farm (1955)
 Be Careful, Grandma! (1960)

References

External links
 
 

1898 births
1963 deaths
Burials at Novodevichy Cemetery
Honored Artists of the RSFSR
People's Artists of the RSFSR
Soviet male actors

Russian male actors